Acyphoderes delicata is a species of beetle in the family Cerambycidae. It was described by Horn in 1894.

References

Acyphoderes
Beetles described in 1894